Circa 89 is a Live recording by the Milwaukee-based rock band The Gufs.

Track listing
All tracks by The Gufs

"Tell The Man Upstairs" - 3:46
"Burning Down The Wall" - 4:08
"Love Falls Down" - 4:23
"Into Nothing" - 4:00
"Out Of Mind" - 6:12
"On Your Cross" - 4:31
"Contradictions" - 5:52
"Brighter Every Day" - 2:59
"Tomorrow Child" - 5:38
"World of Stone" - 3:18
"Until The End" - 5:09
"Aryana" - 3:03

Personnel 

 Goran Kralj - lead vocals
 Dejan Kralj - bass guitar
 Morgan Dawley - lead guitar, backup vocals
 Scott Schwebel - drums

External links
The Gufs Official Website

Notes

1990 albums
The Gufs albums